Jardim Zoológico station is part of the Blue Line of the Lisbon Metro.

History
It is one of the 11 stations that belong to the original Lisbon Metro network, opened on 29 December 1959. This station is located on Praça General Humberto Delgado, connecting to the Sete Rios Railway Station (Sintra and Azambuja Lines) and the Sete Rios Bus terminal. It takes its name from the nearby Lisbon Zoo.

The architectural design of the original station is by Falcão e Cunha. On 25 July 1995 the station was extended and refurbished, based on the architectural design of Benoliel de Carvalho.

Connections

Urban buses

Carris 
 701 Campo Grande (Metro) ⇄ Campo de Ourique (Prazeres)
 716 Alameda D. A. Henriques ⇄ Benfica - Al. Padre Álvaro Proença
 726 Sapadores ⇄ Pontinha Centro
 731 Av. José Malhoa ⇄ Moscavide Centro
 746 Marquês de Pombal ⇄ Estação Damaia
 754 Campo Pequeno ⇄ Alfragide
 755 Poço do Bispo ⇄ Sete Rios
 758 Cais do Sodré ⇄ Portas de Benfica
 768 Cidade Universitária ⇄ Quinta dos Alcoutins
 770 Sete Rios - Circulação via Bairro do Calhau / Serafina

Aerobus 
 Linha 2 Aeroporto ⇄ Sete Rios

Rail

Comboios de Portugal 
 Sintra ⇄ Lisboa - Oriente
 Sintra ⇄ Alverca
 Alcântara-Terra ⇄ Castanheira do Ribatejo
 Lisboa - Santa Apolónia ⇄ Leiria (Regional)
 Lisboa - Santa Apolónia ⇄ Caldas da Rainha (Regional)
 Lisboa - Santa Apolónia ⇄ Torres Vedras (Regional)
 Lisboa - Oriente ⇄ Évora (Intercities)
 Lisboa - Oriente ⇄ Faro (Intercities)

Fertagus 
 Setúbal ⇄ Roma-Areeiro
 Coina ⇄ Roma-Areeiro

See also
 List of Lisbon metro stations

References

External links

Blue Line (Lisbon Metro) stations
Railway stations opened in 1959